Nabageena is a rural locality in the local government area of Circular Head in the North West region of Tasmania.
The 2016 census determined a population of 41 for the state suburb of Nabageena.

History
The locality was gazetted in 1973. Nabageena is the Aboriginal term for “sun”.

Geography
The Duck River forms the southern boundary.

Road infrastructure
The C219 route (South Road) enters from the north-east and passes through the northern part of the locality before exiting to the north-west. Route C223 (Maguires Road) starts at an intersection with route C219 and runs south, east and west before exiting to the south-west.

References

Localities of Circular Head Council
Towns in Tasmania